Proastio (before 1962: Παραπράσταινα - Paraprastaina) is a Greek village in the northern part of the Karditsa regional unit, Greece. Proastio was the seat of the former municipality Sellana. It had a population of 1,666 in 2011. It is located in a flat rural area, near the right bank of the river Pineios. It is 14 km north of Karditsa and 14 km southeast of Trikala.

Population

Famous people

Stefanos Tsitsipas

External links
 Proastio on GTP Travel Pages

See also
List of settlements in the Karditsa regional unit

References

Populated places in Karditsa (regional unit)